When Rome Ruled is a 1914 American silent historical drama film directed by George Fitzmaurice and starring Nell Craig, Clifford Bruce and Riley Hatch. It was made at the American subsidiary of the French company Pathé, shortly to be relaunched as Pathé Exchange, at studios in Fort Lee, New Jersey. It was an attempt to imitate the classical epics of Italian cinema, but made on a much lower budget. It marked the directorial debut of Fitzmaurice who emerged as a leading filmmaker during the 1920s.

Cast
 Nell Craig as Nydia 
 Clifford Bruce as Caius 
 Riley Hatch as Caius' Father 
 Walter R. Seymour as Nydia's Father 
 Rosita Marstini as Caius' Bride 
 A.H. Busby as Caius' Bride's Father 
 Charles E. Bunnell as A High Priest of Jupiter

References

Bibliography
 Jay Robert Nash, Robert Connelly & Stanley Ralph Ross. Motion Picture Guide Silent Film 1910-1936. Cinebooks, 1988.

External links
 

1914 films
1914 directorial debut films
American silent feature films
1910s historical drama films
American historical drama films
Films set in ancient Rome
American black-and-white films
Films directed by George Fitzmaurice
Pathé Exchange films
Films shot in Fort Lee, New Jersey
1914 drama films
1910s English-language films
1910s American films
Silent American drama films
Silent historical drama films